Witzøe is a surname of Norwegian origin. People with that name include:

 Endre Magnus Witzøe (1875-1934), Norwegian ship broker and politician
 Gustav Magnar Witzøe (born 1993), Norwegian billionaire

See also
 

Surnames of Norwegian origin